The 2005 Ukrainian Amateur Cup  was the tenth annual season of Ukraine's football knockout competition for amateur football teams. The competition started on 24 July 2005 and concluded on 22 October 2005.

Competition schedule
This year the cup started from the 1/8th finals, to which six teams had to qualify through the preliminary round.

First round

Second round (1/8)

Quarterfinals (1/4)

Semifinals (1/2)

Final

See also
 2005 Ukrainian Football Amateur League
 2005–06 Ukrainian Cup

External links
 2005 Ukrainian Amateur Cup at the Footpass (Football Federation of Ukraine)

2005
2005 domestic association football cups
Amat